The Georgetown Lighthouse was first built by the Dutch in 1817 and then rebuilt in 1830 to help guide ships into the Demerara River from the Atlantic Ocean. The 31 m (103 feet) high octagonal structure is a famous Georgetown, Guyana landmark with its distinct vertical red and white stripes. The Lighthouse, located on Water Street, is maintained by the National Trust of Guyana.

The brick structure was commissioned on 1 June 1830, when it replaced a wooden lighthouse that had been built on the same site by the Dutch.  British engineers constructed the present lighthouse, reinforcing the building by placing it on a foundation of 49 greenheart piles, making it durable nearly 200 years later.

A floating light was placed at the Demerara bar in March 1838 and a system of signalling to the lighthouse was established.  On 27 February 1838 a Committee of Pilotage was formed and entrusted with the signalling.  Before establishment of the System of Signalling, a beacon had been erected on the East Coast Demerara and vessels entering had to contribute to the cost of constructing the beacon.

About a half mile east of Fort Groyne there was a block house which was used as a signal station for vessels arriving, and for signalling to Berbice.  The coastal signalling was done by semaphore stations.

A steel balcony at the top of the Lighthouse offers a panoramic view of Georgetown and West Coast Demerara. You must climb 138 stairs to access the balcony.

References
  3. https://www.guyanatimesinternational.com/the-lighthouse/

External links
The Georgetown Lighthouse.
Photos.
Georgetown Lighthouse, National Trust of Guyana, 2002–10.

Lighthouses completed in 1830
Buildings and structures in Georgetown, Guyana
History of Guyana
Lighthouses in Guyana
1830 establishments in British Guiana